Broughton Ales is a small independent brewery based in Broughton, Scottish Borders, Scotland.

History

The business was started by James Collins and David Younger in 1979 in a building in Broughton that had previously been an abattoir. The company became insolvent in 1995, and was taken over by Giles Litchfield; in 2015 it again came under new management. In 2018 more than 60% of its beer was for bottling; it also produced some cask ales.

References

External links
Broughton Ales

1979 establishments in the United Kingdom
Breweries in Scotland
Scottish Borders
Companies based in the Scottish Borders